In Greek mythology, Medusa (/mɪˈdjuːzə, -sə/; Ancient Greek: Μέδουσα means "guardian, protectress") may refer to the following personages:

 Medusa, one of the Gorgons.
Medusa, one of the Hesperides and the sister of Aegle, Hesperie and Arethusa.
 Medusa, a Mycenaean princess as the daughter of King Sthenelus and Queen Nicippe (also called Antibia or Archippe), daughter of Pelops. She was the sister of Eurystheus and Alcyone. Also called Astymedusa, she became the second wife of Oedipus after the death of Jocasta.
Medusa, a Trojan princess as daughter of King Priam.
 Medusa, a princess of Iolcus as daughter of King Pelias and Queen Anaxibia, daughter of Bias. 
 Medusa, a resident of Pherae and daughter of Orsilochus. She was probably the sister of Diocles and Dorodoche, said by some to be the wife of Icarius. Medusa married Polybus, king of Corinth and thus, adopted mother of Oedipus.

Notes

References 

 Apollodorus, The Library with an English Translation by Sir James George Frazer, F.B.A., F.R.S. in 2 Volumes, Cambridge, MA, Harvard University Press; London, William Heinemann Ltd. 1921. . Online version at the Perseus Digital Library. Greek text available from the same website.
Gaius Julius Hyginus, Fabulae from The Myths of Hyginus translated and edited by Mary Grant. University of Kansas Publications in Humanistic Studies. Online version at the Topos Text Project.
 Hesiod, Theogony from The Homeric Hymns and Homerica with an English Translation by Hugh G. Evelyn-White, Cambridge, MA.,Harvard University Press; London, William Heinemann Ltd. 1914. Online version at the Perseus Digital Library. Greek text available from the same website.
 Homer, The Iliad with an English Translation by A.T. Murray, Ph.D. in two volumes. Cambridge, MA., Harvard University Press; London, William Heinemann, Ltd. 1924. . Online version at the Perseus Digital Library.
 Homer, Homeri Opera in five volumes. Oxford, Oxford University Press. 1920. . Greek text available at the Perseus Digital Library.
 Homer, The Odyssey with an English Translation by A.T. Murray, PH.D. in two volumes. Cambridge, MA., Harvard University Press; London, William Heinemann, Ltd. 1919. . Online version at the Perseus Digital Library. Greek text available from the same website.
 Pausanias, Description of Greece with an English Translation by W.H.S. Jones, Litt.D., and H.A. Ormerod, M.A., in 4 Volumes. Cambridge, MA, Harvard University Press; London, William Heinemann Ltd. 1918. . Online version at the Perseus Digital Library
 Pausanias, Graeciae Descriptio. 3 vols. Leipzig, Teubner. 1903.  Greek text available at the Perseus Digital Library.
Tzetzes, John, Book of Histories, Book II-IV translated by Gary Berkowitz from the original Greek of T. Kiessling's edition of 1826. Online version at theio.com
 Medusa Tattoo Meaning The story of Medusa begins with her being a beautiful woman, but after she is betrayed, she is turned into a monster.

 Hesperides
Princesses in Greek mythology
Children of Priam
Characters from Iolcus